Masango may refer to:

Places
Massangano, a city in Angola
Masango, Bisoro, a colline of Burundi

People
Bridget Masango (born 1962), South African politician
James Masango, South African politician
Mandla Masango (born 1989), South African football midfielder 
Senteni Masango (1981–2018), 8th wife of Mswati III of Eswatini
Masango Matambanadzo (1964–2020), Zimbabwean politician

Bantu-language surnames
Surnames of African origin